José de la Torre Ugarte y Alarcón (19 March 1786 – 1 September 1831) was a Peruvian lyricist. He is most notable for writing the lyrics of the National Anthem of Peru.

He was the son of Estanislao de la Torre Ugarte and García Guerrero and Mercedes Alarcón Manrique and Nestares. After completing his school studies at San Luis Gonzaga de Ica, he went to the National University of San Marcos, where he held an Arts degree between 1809 and 1812; already graduated from bachelor in canons (canon law of the legal norms that regulate the organization of a church and the discipline of his parishioners), he was authorized to perform forensic practice in 1810, in the study of Antonio Bedoya, but his final exam was left deferred when he died, despite having other teachers later.

He was one of those summoned by the Cabildo of Lima to decide for the independence of Peru, signing the Act of Independence on July 15, 1821. During the government of José de la Riva Agüero, he was appointed senior officer of the Ministry of War in 1821. He moved to  Trujillo in 1823, saving himself from being shot by order of Simón Bolívar, thanks to the intervention of Marshal Antonio Gutiérrez de la Fuente. He was graduated as colonel, and in Trujillo he was a member of the superior court in May 1830.

He married in 1812, in San Jerónimo de Ica, with Manuela Valdivieso and Rizo de la Prada, with whom he had three children.

He was the author of the lyrics of the National Anthem, whose music was written by José Bernardo Alcedo. He also wrote the lyrics of the patriotic song "La Chicha", with music by Alcedo. Late in life he qualified as a lawyer. He also served as war auditor (1827) and member of the Superior Court (1830). He died in Trujillo in 1831.

1798 births
1878 deaths
Peruvian male writers
Torre Ugarte
Torre
National anthem writers